The 1888 United States presidential election in California was held on November 6, 1888 as part of the 1888 United States presidential election. State voters chose eight representatives, or electors, to the Electoral College, who voted for president and vice president.  

California narrowly voted for the Republican challenger, former Indiana United States Senate Benjamin Harrison, over the Democratic incumbent, Grover Cleveland.

Results

Results by county

References

California
1888
1888 California elections